Beanibazar Sporting Club is a Bangladeshi football club from Beanibazar, Sylhet.

History

Beanibazar Sporting Club was formed in 2009 as a professional football club to take part in the Bangladesh Premier League. In 2009–10 season, however, it relegated along with Sukhtara Sangsad, a sport club from Narayanganj. Later it joined Bangladesh Championship League, the 2nd tier league in Bangladesh. It is one of the powerful football club in Sylhet. During their short stay at the top flight former national team player Joshimuddin Ahmed Joshi and also former Mohammedan SC player Ekramur Hossain Rana.

The club's name
There is much confusion with the club's name in the Bangladeshi media. Various channels and websites mention various names of the club's name, e.g. Beanibazar, Biyanibazar, Biyanibazar FC, Biyanibazar Sporting Club. Although the club's website names it "Beanibazar Sporting Club"  it provides no information on it.

Players

Current squad

References

Football clubs in Bangladesh
2009 establishments in Bangladesh
Association football clubs established in 2009
Beanibazar Upazila